William Cordova (born 1969) is a contemporary cultural practitioner and interdisciplinary artist currently residing between Lima, Peru; North Miami Beach, Florida; and New York.

Education 
William Cordova received a B.F.A. from The School of the Art Institute of Chicago in 1996 and later received an M.F.A. from Yale University in 2004. He graduated from Miami Central High School in 1988 and studied Visual Art at Miami Dade Community College (North Campus) from 1991 to 1994.

Career 

William Cordova has been an artist in residence at The Studio Museum in Harlem, the American Academy in Berlin, Germany, Museum of Fine Art in Houston’s CORE program, Headlands Center for the Arts, Artpace, Skowhegan School of Painting & Sculpture, Lower Manhattan Cultural Council among others. He has exhibited in the US, Latin America, Europe and Asia. His work is in the public collection at the Whitney Museum of American Art, Guggenheim Museum, Walker Art Center, Harvard University, Yale University, Museo de Arte de Lima, Ellipse Foundation, Perez Art Museum, La Casa de las Americas in Havana, Cuba among others. Cordova was represented in the 2008 Whitney Biennial, 2010 Museum of Modern Art/PS1 Greater New York exhibition, an overview presentation of contemporary artists whose contributions to the arts have had a significant influence in society. In 2011, Cordova was invited for his first one person museum exhibition in Europe, yawar mallku: royalty, abductions y exiles at La Conservera, Murcia, Spain and also awarded the Joan Mitchell Foundation Grant. Cordova was included in Prospect.3 New Orleans Biennial in 2014 and the 12th Havana Biennial  in 2015 at Casa de Africa, Havana, Cuba. In 2016 included: SITE Santa Fe Biennial, New Mexico, Southern Accents, Nasher Museum, Durham, NC. In 2017 Cordova was awarded the Michael Richards Artist Award by LMCC, NY and the Florida Prize by the Orlando Museum, Orlando, FL.

Solo exhibitions include kuntur: transmissions & portals, Illinois State University, IL and his first career survey exhibition, now’s the time: narratives of southern alchemy, Perez Art Museum; Miami, FL. Group shows include Pacha, Llaqta, Wasichay, Whitney Museum of American Art and the 13th Havana Biennial, Havana, Cuba 2019.

Cordova has been co-curator of the Prizm Art Fair, along with founding Director, Mikhaile Solomon,  focused on African Diaspora Art, taking place during Art Basel Miami since 2017.

In 2019, he founded the AIM Biennial in South Florida. A statewide site specific outdoor expo as a response to the COVID pandemic and to bring attention to Floridas environmental crisis. “I wanted to prod practitioners to be more resourceful, more improvisational, to not let them forget that they are creative problem solvers,” said Cordova. 

Cordova is current co-Lead organizer along with artist Rick Lowe, of the Greenwood Art Project in Tulsa, Oklahoma inviting Tulsans to creatively respond to the 1921 Greenwood Centennial. Cordova was the recipient of the 2021 Guggenheim Fellowship Award.

Work 

"William Cordova’s practice threads forward and back through time, tethering seemingly disparate relations to one another, and analyzing the echoes of history through the devices of their transmission. His work speaks to 'excluded discourses, silenced radicalisms, and insurgent practices' and with this, suggests relationships between these past moments and our own, given that what circulates in public knowledge is always already an unfinished portrait of a culture."

"William Cordova does not simply give up, but diligently or perhaps doggedly, uses fund materials to offer a conceptual map to global relations that has no natural beginning or end, no fixed borders, no national allegiances. He offers a micro-economy of signs that invites us to reflect on the macro-economies of history. His method is not strictly speaking a Foucauldian genealogy, but it shares a similar commitment to finding these uncommon histories, connections, and intersections frequently overlooked in the dominant discourse of government and school text books.”

“Cordova has been preoccupied with issues of transformation and interpretation since his youth, owing partly to his own transitions between countries, economies, and languages. Having recently moved from Lima to Miami, the six-year-old found comfort in the sight of what he thought were familiar Peruvian cajón drums scattered on the streets, but which were in fact discarded speaker boxes. The hulking Badussy (or Machu Picchu after dark) (2004–05) dominates the gallery with some two hundred old speakers stacked to suggest a pre-Columbian monolith.” 

“Much of Cordova’s work induces similarly uncanny interpretive spirals, abetted not by arbitrary Surrealist juxtapositions but the all-too-common strangeness of our own detritus and the too-often repressed histories they conceal.”

“William Cordova, who comes to us by the way of the Incas, Jimi Hendrix and Miami Bass and, for oppositional sake, MTV and Yale, too, now operates in this Harlem game as cultural manufacturer of multiple self-possessed signposts (sic), less ethnographic or geographic than steatopygic. Phat yes, like dub sound system speakers, but fully cognizant of the pluripotential pregnancy of the pause button, too. The pause for the cause that allows one to stop time and affirm”

“The act of reclaiming in Cordova's work is not about holding onto an old way, but of apprehending the lessons of the relationships that interacted and produced these objects. This apprehension leads to appreciation, an increase in the value of what is at hand. It is in this process of making familiar and sitting-with that social change is possible and Cordova's attempts at sparking those conversations is to be lauded.”

“In trying to navigate a complex, interconnected web of meaning, these open-ended works connect these particular histories to the personal histories of each viewer. The introductory text to the exhibition suggests that such a conceptual practice “may ultimately lead to social change, which only happens when we change our perspective.” While small and seemingly open-ended, Cordova’s exhibition provides a platform for social change, one that is more capable than other, more traditional curatorial models.”

“This sense of duality or even multiplicity of reading is a critical component of Cordova’s work, which he frequently creates by using puns and double meanings in both his titles and images.

“He wants us to slow ourselves below a blur, so that we might again see people appear in our blind spots. He wants us to question lost relations, to listen into the emptiness, to consider the unsung circuits of influence and ideas that have made our survival possible, to become enamored once again of the sights and sounds of our path-making, and of the mystery of our continuing. He wants us to think about the sovereignty of communities, a process that moves in its own time. Cordova had reached his thirties by the time his work began attracting critical attention. But he came to the art world the way he approaches his art—purposefully, methodically, attuned to his own cadence and tempo.”

Solo Shows

Group Shows

Awards

References

External links 
 Sikkema Jenkins & Co
 Livia Benavides 80M2
 Arndt Berlin

1969 births
Living people
American contemporary artists
Peruvian artists
School of the Art Institute of Chicago alumni
Yale School of Art alumni